The Ptenoglossa is an informal taxonomic group of sea snails.
This group was considered paraphyletic or polyphyletic by Ponder and Lindberg (1997) in their classification of gastropod molluscs.

The database WoRMS considers this suborder as belonging to the order (unassigned Caenogastropoda) (temporary name)

Taxonomy
Superfamily Epitonioidea
Family Epitoniidae
Family Janthinidae
Family Nystiellidae
Superfamily Eulimoidea
Family Eulimidae
Family Aclididae
Superfamily Triphoroidea
Family Triphoridae
Family Cerithiopsidae
Family Newtoniellidae

References

External links

 Sea Slug Forum

 
Taxa named by John Edward Gray